Gia Metric (born April 16, 1992) is the stage name of Giorgio Triberio, a Canadian drag performer most known for competing on the second season of Canada's Drag Race.

Early life
Triberio was born in Toronto, Ontario.

Career
Gia Metric began her drag career in Toronto. By 2018, she was performing at The Junction's weekly drag showcase in Vancouver, along with Kendall Gender and Synthia Kiss. She was named Vancouver's Entertainer of the Year in 2016, and Vancouver's Next Drag Superstar in 2018. Prior to the COVID-19 pandemic, she was performing in drag 2 to 3 times a week, sometimes as part of the group Brat Pack. After shows were cancelled because of the pandemic, the group hosted a three-hour show on Instagram called Bounce Back, and Gia Metric worked with Priyanka to host a Dua Lipa album release party on Instagram.

She competed on the second season (2021) of Canada's Drag Race. Referring to her popularity upon entering the drag competition, Bernardo Sim of Screen Rant described Gia Metric as "the queen with a big reputation that everyone is aware of". She placed in the bottom two during the first episode, but was saved from elimination after winning a lip sync against Beth. The third episode, she played Blue Scarymore in the slasher film Screech, a parody of Drew Barrymore's character in Scream. She portrayed Jim Carrey during the Snatch Game challenge. She placed fourth in the competition.

Gia Metric walked in New York Fashion Week in 2019. In 2021, she co-hosted Canada's Drag Race viewing parties in Toronto and Vancouver. She is scheduled to appear at RuPaul's DragCon LA in 2022.

Personal life
Triberio is based in Vancouver, as of 2020. Triberio prefers the pronouns they/them out of drag and she/her in drag.

Filmography

Television
 Canada's Drag Race (season 2)

References

External links

 Giorgio Triberio at IMDb
 Exclusive Interview - Gia Metric at Spill the Tea

1992 births
Living people
21st-century Canadian LGBT people
Canada's Drag Race contestants
Canadian drag queens
Non-binary drag performers
People from Toronto
People from Vancouver